The 2008–09 Portland Trail Blazers season was the 39th season of the franchise in the National Basketball Association (NBA). In the playoffs, the Trail Blazers lost to the Houston Rockets in six games in the First Round. The 2008-09 Trail Blazers had the best team offensive rating in the NBA.

Key dates
 June 26: The 2008 NBA draft took place in New York City.
 July 1: The free agency period started.

Offseason
 An MRI revealed that Trail Blazers guard Brandon Roy needed arthroscopic surgery to repair a tear in the meniscus of his left knee. The surgery was scheduled for Thursday, August 14.

Draft picks

Draft Day trades
 Brandon Rush, Jarrett Jack, and Josh McRoberts were traded to the Indiana Pacers for Jerryd Bayless and Ike Diogu
 Darrell Arthur and Joey Dorsey were traded to the Houston Rockets for Nicolas Batum
 Ömer Aşık was traded to the Chicago Bulls for three future second round draft picks
 Mike Taylor was traded to the L.A. Clippers for a future second round draft pick

Roster

Preseason

|- bgcolor="#bbffbb"
|1
|October 7
|Sacramento Kings
|W 110–81
|Webster (15)
|Przybilla (12)
|Roy, Rodríguez (7)
|Rose Garden19,321
|1–0
|- bgcolor="#edbebf"
|2
|October 8
|Golden State Warriors
|L 95–110
|Fernández (15)
|Oden (9)
|Rodríguez (10)
|Rose Garden17,847
|1–1
|- bgcolor="#bbffbb"
|3
|October 10
|Atlanta Hawks
|W 102–80
|S. Randolph (19)
|S. Randolph (10)
|Rodríguez, Bayless (7)
|Sprint Center12,457
|2–1
|- bgcolor="#edbebf"
|4
|October 12
|Utah Jazz
|L 80–93
|Batum (16)
|L. Jackson (7)
|Rodríguez (8)
|Rose Garden19,980
|2–2
|- bgcolor="#bbffbb"
|5
|October 20
|Sacramento Kings
|W 112–98
|Aldridge (24)
|Oden (9)
|Aldridge (5)
|ARCO Arena8,632
|3–2
|- bgcolor="#bbffbb"
|6
|October 22
|Los Angeles Clippers
|W 87–75
|Roy (17)
|Oden (13)
|Blake (6)
|Staples Center10,882
|4–2
|- bgcolor="#edbebf"
|7
|October 23
|Utah Jazz
|L 89–100
|Frye (17)
|Frye (10)
|Rodríguez (7)
|EnergySolutions Arena19,169
|4–3

Regular season

Standings

Game log

|- bgcolor="#ffcccc"
| 1
| October 28
| @ L.A. Lakers
| 
| Travis Outlaw (18)
| Joel Przybilla (11)
| Brandon Roy (5)
| Staples Center18,997
| 0–1
|- bgcolor="#bbffbb"
| 2
| October 31
| San Antonio
| 
| Brandon Roy (26)
| Rudy Fernández (8)
| Brandon Roy (7)
| Rose Garden20,516
| 1–1

|- bgcolor="#ffcccc"
| 3
| November 1
| @ Phoenix
| 
| Brandon Roy, Rudy Fernández (20)
| Joel Przybilla (9)
| Brandon Roy, Travis Outlaw, Sergio Rodríguez (4)
| US Airways Center18,422
| 1–2
|- bgcolor="#ffcccc"
| 4
| November 5
| @ Utah
| 
| Brandon Roy, LaMarcus Aldridge (18)
| Joel Przybilla (16)
| Brandon Roy (6)
| EnergySolutions Arena19,911
| 1–3
|- bgcolor="#bbffbb"
| 5
| November 6
| Houston
| 
| LaMarcus Aldridge (27)
| Travis Outlaw (13)
| Steve Blake (8)
| Rose Garden20,611
| 2–3
|- bgcolor="#bbffbb"
| 6
| November 8
| Minnesota
| 
| LaMarcus Aldridge, Brandon Roy (24)
| LaMarcus Aldridge (13)
| Brandon Roy (9)
| Rose Garden20,599
| 3–3
|- bgcolor="#bbffbb"
| 7
| November 10
| @ Orlando
| 
| Brandon Roy (27)
| LaMarcus Aldridge (11)
| Steve Blake, Brandon Roy, Sergio Rodríguez (4)
| Amway Arena14,210
| 4–3
|- bgcolor="#bbffbb"
| 8
| November 12
| @ Miami
| 
| Rudy Fernández (25)
| Joel Przybilla (10)
| Sergio Rodríguez (5)
| American Airlines Arena15,021
| 5–3
|- bgcolor="#ffcccc"
| 9
| November 14
| @ New Orleans
| 
| Brandon Roy (21)
| Greg Oden (11)
| Sergio Rodríguez (7)
| New Orleans Arena16,071
| 5–4
|- bgcolor="#bbffbb"
| 10
| November 15
| @ Minnesota
| 
| Brandon Roy (24)
| Greg Oden, Joel Przybilla (8)
| Brandon Roy (6)
| Target Center12,213
| 6–4
|- bgcolor="#ffcccc"
| 11
| November 18
| @ Golden State
| 
| Brandon Roy, Greg Oden (22)
| Greg Oden (10)
| Brandon Roy (9)
| Oracle Arena18,284
| 6–5
|- bgcolor="#bbffbb"
| 12
| November 19
| Chicago
| 
| Brandon Roy (20)
| Greg Oden (10)
| Sergio Rodríguez (9)
| Rose Garden20,599
| 7–5
|- bgcolor="#bbffbb"
| 13
| November 21
| @ Sacramento
| 
| Steve Blake (20)
| Joel Przybilla (10)
| Steve Blake (5)
| ARCO Arena12,056
| 8–5
|- bgcolor="#ffcccc"
| 14
| November 22
| @ Phoenix
| 
| Brandon Roy (26)
| Channing Frye, Joel Przybilla (8)
| Steve Blake (5)
| US Airways Center18,422
| 8–6
|- bgcolor="#bbffbb"
| 15
| November 24
| Sacramento
| 
| Brandon Roy (28)
| Joel Przybilla (12)
| Steve Blake (5)
| Rose Garden20,467
| 9–6
|- bgcolor="#bbffbb"
| 16
| November 26
| Miami
| 
| Channing Frye (17)
| Greg Oden (10)
| Sergio Rodríguez (11)
| Rose Garden20,528
| 10–6
|- bgcolor="#bbffbb"
| 17
| November 28
| New Orleans
| 
| Brandon Roy (25)
| Greg Oden (8)
| Brandon Roy (10)
| Rose Garden20,638
| 11–6
|- bgcolor="#bbffbb"
| 18
| November 30
| @ Detroit
| 
| LaMarcus Aldridge (27)
| Greg Oden (13)
| Steve Blake (7)
| The Palace of Auburn Hills22,076
| 12–6

|- bgcolor="#bbffbb"
| 19
| December 2
| @ New York
| 
| Brandon Roy (23)
| Joel Przybilla (14)
| Steve Blake (6)
| Madison Square Garden18,664
| 13–6
|- bgcolor="#bbffbb"
| 20
| December 3
| @ Washington
| 
| Brandon Roy (22)
| Greg Oden (10)
| Sergio Rodríguez (7)
| Verizon Center12,802
| 14–6
|- bgcolor="#ffcccc"
| 21
| December 5
| @ Boston
| 
| Travis Outlaw, LaMarcus Aldridge (13)
| Joel Przybilla (8)
| Steve Blake (4)
| TD Banknorth Garden18,624
| 14–7
|- bgcolor="#bbffbb"
| 22
| December 7
| @ Toronto
| 
| LaMarcus Aldridge (20)
| Greg Oden (10)
| Brandon Roy (7)
| Air Canada Centre17,671
| 15–7
|- bgcolor="#ffcccc"
| 23
| December 9
| Orlando
| 
| Brandon Roy (30)
| LaMarcus Aldridge (13)
| Sergio Rodríguez (7)
| Rose Garden20,642
| 15–8
|- bgcolor="#ffcccc"
| 24
| December 11
| @ Utah
| 
| Brandon Roy (33)
| Greg Oden (9)
| Steve Blake (5)
| EnergySolutions Arena19,911
| 15–9
|- bgcolor="#ffcccc"
| 25
| December 12
| L.A. Clippers
| 
| Brandon Roy (38)
| Greg Oden (15)
| Brandon Roy (9)
| Rose Garden20,558
| 15–10
|- bgcolor="#bbffbb"
| 26
| December 16
| Sacramento
| 
| Brandon Roy (29)
| Joel Przybilla (14)
| Sergio Rodríguez, Brandon Roy (5)
| Rose Garden20,005
| 16–10
|- bgcolor="#bbffbb"
| 27
| December 18
| Phoenix
| 
| Brandon Roy (52)
| Travis Outlaw, Joel Przybilla (6)
| Steve Blake (10)
| Rose Garden20,650
| 17–10
|- bgcolor="#ffcccc"
| 28
| December 22
| @ Denver
| 
| LaMarcus Aldridge (20)
| Joel Przybilla (8)
| Brandon Roy (5)
| Pepsi Center18,611
| 17–11
|- bgcolor="#bbffbb"
| 29
| December 23
| Denver
| 
| LaMarcus Aldridge (22)
| Joel Przybilla (19)
| Brandon Roy (6)
| Rose Garden20,007
| 18–11
|- bgcolor="#ffcccc"
| 30
| December 25
| Dallas
| 
| Brandon Roy (22)
| Brandon Roy, Joel Przybilla, Greg Oden (5)
| Steve Blake (7)
| Rose Garden20,643
| 18–12
|- bgcolor="#bbffbb"
| 31
| December 27
| Toronto
| 
| Brandon Roy (32)
| Greg Oden (10)
| Brandon Roy (9)
| Rose Garden20,588
| 19–12
|- bgcolor="#bbffbb"
| 32
| December 30
| Boston
| 
| Steve Blake (21)
| Greg Oden (11)
| Steve Blake, Greg Oden (3)
| Rose Garden20,651
| 20–12

|- bgcolor="#ffcccc"
| 33
| January 2
| New Orleans
| 
| Rudy Fernández (19)
| LaMarcus Aldridge (10)
| Steve Blake (6)
| Rose Garden20,708
| 20–13
|- bgcolor="#ffcccc"
| 34
| January 4
| @ L.A. Lakers
| 
| LaMarcus Aldridge (22)
| LaMarcus Aldridge (11)
| Nicolas Batum, Sergio Rodríguez, Jerryd Bayless, LaMarcus Aldridge (4)
| Staples Center18,997
| 20–14
|- bgcolor="#bbffbb"
| 35
| January 7
| Detroit
| 
| LaMarcus Aldridge (26)
| Joel Przybilla (7)
| Steve Blake (10)
| Rose Garden20,644
| 21–14
|- bgcolor="#bbffbb"
| 36
| January 10
| Golden State
| 
| LaMarcus Aldridge (26)
| Greg Oden (8)
| Rudy Fernández (6)
| Rose Garden20,687
| 22–14
|- bgcolor="#bbffbb"
| 37
| January 12
| @ Chicago
| 
| Travis Outlaw (33)
| Greg Oden (13)
| Steve Blake (10)
| United Center18,996
| 23–14
|- bgcolor="#ffcccc"
| 38
| January 14
| @ Philadelphia
| 
| Brandon Roy (27)
| LaMarcus Aldridge, Joel Przybilla (9)
| Brandon Roy (6)
| Wachovia Center14,561
| 23–15
|- bgcolor="#bbffbb"
| 39
| January 15
| @ New Jersey
| 
| Brandon Roy (29)
| Joel Przybilla (11)
| Brandon Roy (5)
| Izod Center13,824
| 24–15
|- bgcolor="#ffcccc"
| 40
| January 17
| @ Charlotte
| 
| LaMarcus Aldridge (21)
| Joel Przybilla (10)
| Brandon Roy (6)
| Time Warner Cable Arena17,482
| 24–16
|- bgcolor="#bbffbb"
| 41
| January 19
| Milwaukee
| 
| Greg Oden (24)
| Greg Oden (15)
| Sergio Rodríguez, Brandon Roy (7)
| Rose Garden20,580
| 25–16
|- bgcolor="#ffcccc"
| 42
| January 21
| Cleveland
| 
| Brandon Roy (23)
| Joel Przybilla (15)
| Sergio Rodríguez (5)
| Rose Garden20,632
| 25–17
|- bgcolor="#bbffbb"
| 43
| January 24
| Washington
| 
| Brandon Roy (22)
| Greg Oden (14)
| Sergio Rodríguez (8)
| Rose Garden20,566
| 26–17
|- bgcolor="#bbffbb"
| 44
| January 26
| @ L.A. Clippers
| 
| Brandon Roy (33)
| Joel Przybilla (8)
| Jerryd Bayless (6)
| Staples Center16,570
| 27–17
|- bgcolor="#bbffbb"
| 45
| January 28
| Charlotte
| 
| LaMarcus Aldridge (25)
| Greg Oden (14)
| Sergio Rodríguez (7)
| Rose Garden20,380
| 28–17
|- bgcolor="#bbffbb"
| 46
| January 31
| Utah
| 
| Brandon Roy (30)
| Joel Przybilla (17)
| Sergio Rodríguez (7)
| Rose Garden20,593
| 29–17

|- bgcolor="#bbffbb"
| 47
| February 2
| @ New Orleans
| 
| LaMarcus Aldridge (22)
| LaMarcus Aldridge (11)
| Jerryd Bayless (6)
| New Orleans Arena14,781
| 30–17
|- bgcolor="#ffcccc"
| 48
| February 4
| @ Dallas
| 
| Brandon Roy (26)
| Brandon Roy (7)
| Jerryd Bayless, Travis Outlaw (4)
| American Airlines Center19,767
| 30–18
|- bgcolor="#ffcccc"
| 49
| February 6
| @ Oklahoma City
| 
| Brandon Roy (32)
| Brandon Roy (9)
| Brandon Roy (6)
| Ford Center18,694
| 30–19
|- bgcolor="#bbffbb"
| 50
| February 8
| New York
| 
| Travis Outlaw (23)
| Greg Oden (12)
| Brandon Roy (8)
| Rose Garden20,609
| 31–19
|- bgcolor="#bbffbb"
| 51
| February 11
| Oklahoma City
| 
| Brandon Roy (22)
| Joel Przybilla (14)
| Jerryd Bayless (8)
| Rose Garden20,050
| 32–19
|- bgcolor="#ffcccc"
| 52
| February 12
| @ Golden State
| 
| Brandon Roy (37)
| Travis Outlaw (12)
| Sergio Rodríguez (7)
| Oracle Arena19,322
| 32–20
|- bgcolor="#bbffbb"
| 53
| February 18
| Memphis
| 
| Brandon Roy (24)
| Joel Przybilla (15)
| Brandon Roy (9)
| Rose Garden20,385
| 33–20
|- bgcolor="#bbffbb"
| 54
| February 20
| Atlanta
| 
| Brandon Roy (27)
| LaMarcus Aldridge (11)
| Steve Blake, Brandon Roy (5)
| Rose Garden20,250
| 34–20
|- bgcolor="#bbffbb"
| 55
| February 22
| L.A. Clippers
| 
| LaMarcus Aldridge (28)
| LaMarcus Aldridge (10)
| Steve Blake (17)
| Rose Garden20,447
| 35–20
|- bgcolor="#ffcccc"
| 56
| February 24
| @ Houston
| 
| Brandon Roy (24)
| LaMarcus Aldridge, Joel Przybilla (8)
| Brandon Roy, Steve Blake (5)
| Toyota Center17,515
| 35–21
|- bgcolor="#ffcccc"
| 57
| February 25
| @ San Antonio
| 
| Channing Frye (15)
| Joel Przybilla (10)
| Sergio Rodríguez (7)
| AT&T Center18,672
| 35–22
|- bgcolor="#bbffbb"
| 58
| February 27
| @ Minnesota
| 
| Brandon Roy (19)
| LaMarcus Aldridge (10)
| Steve Blake (6)
| Target Center17,017
| 36–22

|- bgcolor="#bbffbb"
| 59
| March 1
| San Antonio
| 
| LaMarcus Aldridge, Brandon Roy (26)
| Joel Przybilla (10)
| Steve Blake (6)
| Rose Garden20,627
| 37–22
|- bgcolor="#bbffbb"
| 60
| March 4
| Indiana
| 
| Brandon Roy (28)
| Joel Przybilla (12)
| Rudy Fernández (4)
| Rose Garden20,020
| 38–22
|- bgcolor="#ffcccc"
| 61
| March 5
| @ Denver
| 
| Brandon Roy (22)
| Joel Przybilla (12)
| Steve Blake (5)
| Pepsi Center16,801
| 38–23
|- bgcolor="#bbffbb"
| 62
| March 7
| Minnesota
| 
| Brandon Roy (31)
| LaMarcus Aldridge (11)
| Brandon Roy (6)
| Rose Garden20,535
| 39–23
|- bgcolor="#bbffbb"
| 63
| March 9
| L.A. Lakers
| 
| Brandon Roy (27)
| Joel Przybilla (18)
| Sergio Rodríguez, Steve Blake (6)
| Rose Garden20,573
| 40–23
|- bgcolor="#ffcccc"
| 64
| March 11
| Dallas
| 
| LaMarcus Aldridge (23)
| Joel Przybilla (15)
| Brandon Roy (6)
| Rose Garden20,286
| 40–24
|- bgcolor="#bbffbb"
| 65
| March 13
| New Jersey
| 
| Brandon Roy (31)
| LaMarcus Aldridge, Travis Outlaw (10)
| Steve Blake (5)
| Rose Garden20,634
| 41–24
|- bgcolor="#ffcccc"
| 66
| March 15
| @ Atlanta
| 
| Brandon Roy (29)
| Joel Przybilla (14)
| Brandon Roy (5)
| Philips Arena14,413
| 41–25
|- bgcolor="#bbffbb"
| 67
| March 16
| @ Memphis
| 
| LaMarcus Aldridge (22)
| Joel Przybilla (13)
| Brandon Roy (9)
| FedExForum11,417
| 42–25
|- bgcolor="#bbffbb"
| 68
| March 18
| @ Indiana
| 
| Brandon Roy (20)
| Joel Przybilla (11)
| Steve Blake (8)
| Conseco Fieldhouse13,072
| 43–25
|- bgcolor="#ffcccc"
| 69
| March 19
| @ Cleveland
| 
| Brandon Roy (24)
| Joel Przybilla (11)
| Brandon Roy, Steve Blake (7)
| Quicken Loans Arena20,562
| 43–26
|- bgcolor="#bbffbb"
| 70
| March 21
| @ Milwaukee
| 
| Brandon Roy (30)
| Joel Przybilla (14)
| Brandon Roy (7)
| Bradley Center17,809
| 44–26
|- bgcolor="#ffcccc"
| 71
| March 23
| Philadelphia
| 
| LaMarcus Aldridge (24)
| LaMarcus Aldridge (12)
| LaMarcus Aldridge, Steve Blake (5)
| Rose Garden20,620
| 44–27
|- bgcolor="#bbffbb"
| 72
| March 26
| Phoenix
| 
| LaMarcus Aldridge (29)
| LaMarcus Aldridge (12)
| Sergio Rodríguez (8)
| Rose Garden20,620
| 45–27
|- bgcolor="#bbffbb"
| 73
| March 28
| Memphis
| 
| Brandon Roy (21)
| Joel Przybilla (10)
| Sergio Rodríguez, Brandon Roy, Steve Blake (4)
| Rose Garden20,680
| 46–27
|- bgcolor="#bbffbb"
| 74
| March 31
| Utah
| 
| LaMarcus Aldridge (26)
| Joel Przybilla (9)
| Brandon Roy (11)
| Rose Garden20,675
| 47–27

|- bgcolor="#bbffbb"
| 75
| April 3
| @ Oklahoma City
| 
| LaMarcus Aldridge (35)
| LaMarcus Aldridge (18)
| Steve Blake (10)
| Ford Center19,136
| 48–27
|- bgcolor="#ffcccc"
| 76
| April 5
| @ Houston
| 
| LaMarcus Aldridge, Brandon Roy (22)
| LaMarcus Aldridge (9)
| Brandon Roy (6)
| Toyota Center18,214
| 48–28
|- bgcolor="#bbffbb"
| 77
| April 7
| @ Memphis
| 
| Brandon Roy (24)
| LaMarcus Aldridge (8)
| Brandon Roy (4)
| FedExForum10,089
| 49–28
|- bgcolor="#bbffbb"
| 78
| April 8
| @ San Antonio
| 
| Brandon Roy (26)
| Joel Przybilla (17)
| Steve Blake (7)
| AT&T Center18,797
| 50–28
|- bgcolor="#bbffbb"
| 79
| April 10
| L.A. Lakers
| 
| Brandon Roy (24)
| Joel Przybilla (13)
| Brandon Roy (8)
| Rose Garden20,681
| 51–28
|- bgcolor="#bbffbb"
| 80
| April 11
| @ L.A. Clippers
| 
| LaMarcus Aldridge (21)
| Joel Przybilla (14)
| Steve Blake (5)
| Staples Center18,321
| 52–28
|- bgcolor="#bbffbb"
| 81
| April 13
| Oklahoma City
| 
| Travis Outlaw (21)
| Joel Przybilla (12)
| Sergio Rodríguez (8)
| Rose Garden20,655
| 53–28
|- bgcolor="#bbffbb"
| 82
| April 15
| Denver
| 
| Travis Outlaw (21)
| Joel Przybilla (8)
| Sergio Rodríguez (12)
| Rose Garden20,652
| 54–28

Playoffs

|- bgcolor="#ffcccc"
| 1
| April 18
| Houston
| 
| Brandon Roy (21)
| four players (5)
| Steve Blake (6)
| Rose Garden20,329
| 0–1
|- bgcolor="#bbffbb"
| 2
| April 21
| Houston
| 
| Brandon Roy (42)
| LaMarcus Aldridge (12)
| Steve Blake (5)
|Rose Garden20,408
| 1–1
|- bgcolor="#ffcccc"
| 3
| April 24
| @ Houston
| 
| Brandon Roy (19)
| LaMarcus Aldridge (8)
| Steve Blake (10)
| Toyota Center18,371
| 1–2
|- bgcolor="#ffcccc"
| 4
| April 26
| @ Houston
| 
| Brandon Roy (31)
| Joel Przybilla (12)
| Steve Blake (8)
| Toyota Center18,271
| 1–3
|- bgcolor="#bbffbb"
| 5
| April 28
| Houston
| 
| Roy, Aldridge (25)
| Aldridge, Blake (7)
| Joel Przybilla (4)
| Rose Garden20,462
| 2–3
|- bgcolor="#ffcccc"
| 6
| April 30
| @ Houston
| 
| LaMarcus Aldridge (25)
| Fernández, Przybilla (8)
| Steve Blake (5)
| Toyota Center18,376
| 2–4

Player statistics

Season

Playoffs

Awards and records

Awards
 Brandon Roy, All-NBA Second Team
 Rudy Fernandez, NBA All-Rookie Second Team

Records
 12/18/08 – Brandon Roy scores 52 points (2nd most in team history) in 124-119 win over Phoenix.
 2/22/09 – Steve Blake ties the NBA record and sets the team record of assists in a quarter with 14 against the Los Angeles Clippers.
 4/15/09 – Rudy Fernández sets the rookie record for 3-point baskets made in a season with 159.

Transactions

Trades

Additions

Subtractions

Free agents

Additions

Subtractions

References

Portland Trail Blazers seasons
Portland
Portland Trail Blazers 2008
2008 in sports in Oregon
2009 in sports in Oregon
Portland Trail Blazers